Roman Korban (born 23 May 1927) is a Polish middle-distance runner. He competed in the men's 800 metres at the 1952 Summer Olympics.

References

1927 births
Living people
People from Nadvirna
People from Stanisławów Voivodeship
Athletes (track and field) at the 1952 Summer Olympics
Polish male middle-distance runners
Olympic athletes of Poland
20th-century Polish people